In software engineering, concurrency patterns are those types of design patterns that deal with the multi-threaded programming paradigm. 

Examples of this class of patterns include:

 Active Object
 Balking pattern
 Barrier
 Double-checked locking
 Guarded suspension
  Leaders/followers pattern
 Monitor Object
 Nuclear reaction
 Reactor pattern
 Read write lock pattern
 Scheduler pattern
 Thread pool pattern
 Thread-local storage

See also 
Design Patterns
Behavioral pattern
Creational pattern
Structural pattern

References

External links 
 ScaleConf Presentation about concurrency patterns
 GopherCon Rethinking Classical Concurrency Patterns slides
 GoWiki: Learn Concurrency

Recordings about concurrency patterns from Software Engineering Radio:
 Episode 12: Concurrency Pt. 1
 Episode 19: Concurrency Pt. 2
 Episode 29: Concurrency Pt. 3

Concurrent computing
Software design patterns
Concurrency (computer science)